The 65th Cavalry Division was a cavalry division of the United States Army Organized Reserves. It was created due to the perceived need for additional cavalry units.  It was numbered in succession with the Regular Army cavalry divisions, not all of which were active at its creation.

The 65th Cavalry Division was organized in the Mid-Western United States.  The division was composed of personnel from Illinois, Michigan and Wisconsin.

Organization
In 1940, the division included the following units:
 Headquarters (Chicago)
 Headquarters, Special Troops (Chicago)
 Headquarters Troop (Chicago)
 65th Signal Troop (Chicago)
 585th Ordnance Company (Medium) (Chicago)
 465th Tank Company (Light) (Chicago)
 159th Cavalry Brigade (Chicago)
 317th Cavalry Regiment (Chicago)
 318th Cavalry Regiment (La Grange)
 160th Cavalry Brigade (Detroit)
 319th Cavalry Regiment (Detroit)
 320th Cavalry Regiment (Milwaukee)
 865th Field Artillery Regiment (Chicago)
 465th Reconnaissance Squadron (Detroit)
 465th Quartermaster Squadron (Chicago)
 405th Engineer Squadron (Chicago)
 365th Medical Squadron (Chicago)

Notes

References
 
 
 

 

65
Military units and formations established in 1921
Military units and formations disestablished in 1941